was a Japanese samurai and commander of the Sengoku period. He was the head of the Jinbō clan and Shugodai of the Etchū Province. In the middle of the 15th century, Jinbō clan was the most powerful clan in the Etchū province.

Nagamoto surrendered when he was attacked by Uesugi Kenshin and belonged under the command of the Uesugi clan. But Nagamoto was expelled from the Toyama castle.

References

Samurai